The Bruce Springsteen 1992–1993 World Tour was a concert tour featuring Bruce Springsteen and a new backing band, that took place from mid-1992 to mid-1993.  It followed the simultaneous release of his albums Human Touch and Lucky Town earlier in 1992.   It was his first of four non-E Street Band tours.  Later, Springsteen had more non-E Street Band tours, the Ghost of Tom Joad Tour, the Seeger Sessions Tour, and the Devils & Dust Tour. The tour was not as commercially or critically successful as past tours, due to poor reception of Human Touch and Lucky Town as well as changes from previous tours. According to Springsteen biographer Dave Marsh, die-hard fans have informally referred to the backing band as "the Other Band" (and the tour as "The Other Band Tour").

Itinerary
The tour was preceded by a June 5, 1992, U.S. "dress rehearsal" radio broadcast of the new band.  Springsteen said, "I missed playing. I missed getting out. I missed the fans. I've been home a while. I've worked hard on the records."  The tour's first leg was conducted in arenas in Western Europe, opening on June 15, 1992, at the Globen in Stockholm.  Springsteen said, "It's nice to start the tour here. It's nice to be back among people who have always been hospitable." After 15 dates there, including five at London's Wembley Arena, the tour came home to the United States.

There, the second leg began in late July with a then-record 11 consecutive dates in New Jersey's Meadowlands Arena.  It continued in arenas through the U.S. and Canada, for a total of 61 shows through mid-December.

Springsteen then took a three-month winter break, before starting up again in late March for the third leg, a longer stint in Western Europe that played 31 dates there, some in outdoor stadiums.  The tour proper ended on June 1, 1993, in Oslo's Valle Hovin.

The 1992–1993 Tour backing band
Springsteen had dissolved his long-time backing E Street Band in 1989, and had not used them on Human Touch and Lucky Town.  This tour was his first time out with another group.  Looking for a somewhat different sound, he assembled an outfit that gave him both more guitar-based arrangements and a more R&B-based feel with more backup singers; gone were the organ and saxophone key elements of the traditional E Street sound.

Keyboardist Roy Bittan was the only E Street Band member retained.  Most of the rest of the touring band were experienced session musicians who were not well known to the general music audience.  Better-known ace session drummer Jeff Porcaro, who had played on Human Touch, was supposedly offered $1 million to join the tour, but instead stayed with his band Toto.

Springsteen's new wife and previous E Street backup singer Patti Scialfa was not a regular member of this band, but made guest appearances at many shows to duet with Springsteen on some combination of "Brilliant Disguise", "Tougher Than the Rest", and "Human Touch".

The show
Shows typically began with several selections from the new albums—typically the self-described happy songs "Better Days", "Local Hero", and "Lucky Town"—and emphasized the new material throughout. Slots for older songs were mostly given to numbers from his massively-selling 1984 Born in the U.S.A. album.

Highlights from the new material included Springsteen crowd surfing during "Leap of Faith"; nature imagery motifs running through the show and culminating with frequent show closer "My Beautiful Reward"; a distortion-fest on "57 Channels (And Nothin' On)", one of several numbers where the band's sound verged on heavy metal; and the emotional peak of "Living Proof" with its U2-styled synthesizer settings.

The main set closer continued to be "Light of Day", a role that it had assumed in the Tunnel of Love Express Tour and here was elongated with an "I'm just a prisoner ... of rock and roll!" rap, while the band introductions song was "Glory Days" in the encores.

Springsteen 1970s classics that were heavily identified with the E Street Band sound were finessed either by rearranging them ("Thunder Road" was recast on acoustic guitar) or avoiding them (gone were the epics "Backstreets", "Jungleland", and "Racing in the Street"). Springsteen's biggest hit single, 1984's "Dancing in the Dark", was stripped down to near-solo electric guitar and given a tired, weary reading, before being dropped from the set lists altogether.

Commercial and critical reaction

The tour played a large number of dates and sold many tickets. The eleven-show stint in the Meadowlands surpassed his 10-show run there in the first leg of the Born in the U.S.A. Tour, but ticket demand was much higher then; here, the shows were not actually sold out at start time. Ticket sales were strong along the Eastern Seaboard, but weaker in areas such as Cleveland and Detroit, a reflection of the two albums' lackluster sales performance and failure to generate much in the way of hit singles.

Critical reception of the tour was varied. Lars Lindström reviewed the opening Stockholm show for Back Beat and said, "the musicians have not yet become a band – and they lack the moments of total togetherness both musically and physically. Only singer and percussionist Crystal Taliefero [...] and singer Bobby King have the undisputed charisma."  USA Today nationally visible music writer Edna Gundersen thought very highly of the opening New Jersey show, saying that "For those doubting that such [domestic bliss and] inner contentment can co-exist with rebellious rock passion, Springsteen offers living proof: an emotionally resonating, downright rowdy 27-song rock 'n' roll shindig." She also said that the new band was "a cohesive force worthy of succeeding the crack E Street Band", and also called out Taliefero for praise.  The New York Timess Jon Pareles, reviewing the same show, also commented about the show's themes of "the healing power and everyday complications of love", and said that "Mr. King brings a falsetto gospel to songs with a touch of 1960's soul music, while Ms. Taliefero is a sassy female foil."  Matty Karas of the Asbury Park Press wrote that "The whole show seemed something of a monologue on what he's been up to: getting divorced, getting remarried, having children, changing bands, sorting out a rocky life, falling off the pop charts, realizing there are more important things in life than rock 'n' roll and realizing you need to rock 'n' roll anyway.  Mirroring his real life, it was as directly autobiographical a show as he's ever performed."

Fan response fell roughly into three categories:
 Those who welcomed the new sound and thought highly of the shows
 Those who were open to a new sound but did not think that this particular band hit the mark
 Those who were aghast at the very notion of departing from the E Street sound.

It is impossible to measure the relative proportion of these; among the Springsteen faithful, the most common verdict over time has been that they enjoyed the shows while they were there, but have not felt cause to revisit them (via bootleg or official recordings) since. However, Springsteen biographer Dave Marsh later wrote that the Springsteen hard-core fan base had rejected the tour because "its sound was somewhat blacker."  Whatever the cause, certain new numbers such as "Big Muddy" and "If I Should Fall Behind" were completely ineffective in the United States, eliciting  an exodus to the beer and bathroom lines and minimal applause afterward.

Several specific developments did annoy fans.  One was the general discovery that Springsteen was using a Teleprompter to remember his words. It soon became clear that he was dependent upon the device, as for on long lyrics such as "Thunder Road" he would check the screen a good eight or nine times.  A similar discovery was made by those seated behind the stage, that drummer Zachary Alford was using a red-LED metronome to keep proper time.  Finally was the unexpected outcome of the band's MTV Unplugged appearance, where Springsteen lost confidence in the band and, after one acoustic song, did the rest of the concert in normal electric mode, thus violating the show's fundamental premise.  This did result in the In Concert/MTV Plugged album release, which documents what the 1992–1993 Tour band sounded like.

In the end, the fact that this was still a rock band, with a still conventional instrumental line-up, meant that it would be directly compared with the E Street Band and thus find it hard to establish a significant identity of its own.  Over a  decade later, Springsteen would solve this problem in his next non-E Street Band, non-solo tour, the Sessions Band Tour, where the makeup of the band and of their sound was utterly different from anything before and thus impossible to compare.

Broadcasts and recordings
As previously mentioned, a national radio rehearsal show and the abortive MTV Plugged show, the latter of which as In Concert/MTV Plugged was released in audio on CD and in video on VHS and later DVD formats.

Several shows have been released as part of the Bruce Springsteen Archives:
 Brendan Byrne Arena, New Jersey June 24, 1993, released January 5, 2018
 Meadowlands, July 25, 1992, released May 3, 2019
 Boston December 13, 1992, released May 7, 2021
 ‘’Berlin May 14, 1993’’, released April 1, 2022

Tour dates

Cancellations and rescheduled shows

Songs performed

Source:

Band members
 Bruce Springsteen – lead vocals, guitar & harmonica
 Shane Fontayne – guitar
 Tommy Sims – bass
 Zachary Alford – drums
 Roy Bittan – keyboards
 Crystal Taliefero – guitar, percussion & background vocals, saxophone on "Born to Run"
 Bobby King – background vocals
 Gia Ciambotti – background vocals
 Carol Dennis – background vocals
 Cleopatra Kennedy – background vocals
 Angel Rogers – background vocals
 Patti Scialfa – guest appearances for  guitar & harmony vocals on "Brilliant Disguise", "Tougher Than The Rest", and "Human Touch"
 Jon Bon Jovi – lead vocals, guitar (Last show on April 3)
 Richie Sambora – lead vocals, guitar (Last show on April 3)

Notes

Sources
 Killing Floor's concert database supplies the itinerary and set lists for the shows, but unfortunately does not support direct linking to individual dates.
  Brucebase the same, with ticket and promotional images as well.

Bruce Springsteen concert tours
1992 concert tours
1993 concert tours